Bridenbecker Creek is a river in Herkimer County in the state of New York. It flows into the Mohawk River by Frankfort. Bridenbecker Creek is named after the Bridenbecker family who had a farm in the area in the 1800s.

Water quality
Water in the Bridenbecker Creek watershed is moderately healthy.

References 

Rivers of Herkimer County, New York
Mohawk River
Rivers of New York (state)